Jílové (until 1945 Jílové u Podmokel) is a town in Děčín District in the Ústí nad Labem Region of the Czech Republic. It has about 5,100 inhabitants.

Administrative parts
Villages of Kamenec, Kamenná, Martiněves, Modrá and Sněžník are administrative parts of Jílové.

Geography
It lies in the Elbe Sandstone Mountains and in the eponymous protected landscape area. The built-up area is situated in the valley of the Jílovský Stream, a left tributary of the Elbe River.

History

Jílové was probably founded as a settlement on an ancient trade route from Bohemia to Lusatia. The nearby Lotarův vrch mountain may already had been the site of the 1126 Battle of Chlumec between Duke Soběslav I of Bohemia and King Lothair III of Germany, whose exact location is unknown. The first written mention of Jílové (under the name Eulow) is from 1384 in a deed issued by King Charles IV.

A local water castle, erected in the 14th century, was documented in 1554, when it was held by the Lords of Lípa. After the 1620 Battle of White Mountain, the estates were seized by Emperor Ferdinand II and in 1629 granted to the Counts of Thun und Hohenstein.

After World War II, the German population was expelled and the Thun und Hohenstein properties were confiscated by the Czechoslovak Republic. Jílové was promoted to a town in 1964.

Demographics

Sights

The main landmark is the Jílové Castle. It was rebuilt in the second half of the 17th century on a Renaissance chateau, and the romantic-style park with a Neoclassical pavilion was established two centuries later. Nowadays the castle serves cultural and social purposes and houses a library.

The Baroque Church of the Holy Trinity was built in 1682 and rebuilt in 1859 after it was damaged by a fire.

Děčínský Sněžník is known for its observation tower. The chapel on Děčínský Sněžník was built in 1909.

Notable people
Anna Perthen (1866–1957), politician
Ernst Paul (1897–1978), German politician

Twin towns – sister cities

Jílové is twinned with:
 Rosenthal-Bielatal, Germany

References

External links

Cities and towns in the Czech Republic
Populated places in Děčín District
Elbe Sandstone Mountains